Gunstock Knob is a summit in West Virginia, in the United States.

Gunstock Knob was named for the fact an early settler fashioned a gun stock from the wood of a tree taken from the summit.

References

Mountains of Kanawha County, West Virginia
Mountains of West Virginia